The Song of Names is a 2019 drama film directed by François Girard. An adaptation of the novel of the same name by Norman Lebrecht, it stars Tim Roth and Clive Owen as childhood friends from London whose lives have been changed by World War II. The film was nominated for nine Canadian Screen Awards, winning five.

Plot
Dovidl Rappaport, a 9-year-old from Poland who lost his parents and siblings in World War II, is also a prodigy at the violin. The Simmonds family adopt him and he is taken to England. Their son Martin starts bonding with his new adoptive brother as he likes Dovidl (anglicized to David) playing the violin.

David continues practicing the violin while still remembering his biological family. Years pass, and David and Martin are now 21 years old. There is just one day left for a concert featuring David, when he mysteriously disappears with his violin.

It is revealed that David had fallen asleep on a bus and visits a Polish Jewish community in Stoke Newington, asking them about whether his family is still alive. He is then taken to a synagogue, where a list of people with the surname Rapaport who died during the WW2 is announced (in the form of a song, to make it easier to remember). After finding out that none of his family has survived, David breaks down.

Years later, in about 1986, Martin is now 56 years old and is married. He learns about a violinist, who he notices plays in the same pattern as his brother David, who had disappeared about 35 years ago. Martin then sets off to Poland to find his brother.

After meeting David's former love, who says that David left on a plane but told her where he was going, Martin arrives in New York, where he finds David, married with children. Martin is furious with David and tries to persuade him to perform at a concert. David at first refuses, but then accepts on two conditions (not revealed in the scene).

Two months later, Martin and his wife attend the concert, where David first plays with an orchestra, and then has a solo performance, in which he plays the 'Song of Names', remembering his family. Martin then receives a letter from David stating the former must think of the latter as dead and they must never meet again. The film ends with Martin reading the Kaddish, having reluctantly accepted that David is now dead to him.

Cast 
 Tim Roth as Martin Simmonds
 Gerran Howell as Martin Simmonds aged 17–23
 Misha Handley as Martin Simmonds aged 9–13
 Clive Owen as Dovidl Rapoport
 Jonah Hauer-King as Dovidl Rapoport aged 17–21
 Luke Doyle as Dovidl Rapoport aged 9–13
Stanley Townsend as Gilbert Simmonds
 Catherine McCormack as Helen Simmonds
 Saul Rubinek as Mr. Feinman
 Eddie Izzard as BBC Radio Announcer

Release 
The film premiered at the 2019 Toronto International Film Festival.

Reception 
The Song of Names received mixed to negative reviews. The website's critics consensus states, "The Song of Names is made from intriguing ingredients, but they never quite coalesce into a drama that satisfies the way it should."

Accolades
At the 8th Canadian Screen Awards The Song of Names tied with Antigone for most wins, with five.

References

External links

The Song of Names at Library and Archives of Canada

2019 films
2019 drama films
Canadian drama films
British drama films
German drama films
Hungarian drama films
English-language Canadian films
English-language German films
English-language Hungarian films
Films directed by François Girard
Films with screenplays by Jeffrey Caine
Sony Pictures Classics films
Films scored by Howard Shore
2010s English-language films
2010s Canadian films
2010s British films
2010s German films